Jude Dibia (born 5 January 1975 in Lagos, Nigeria) is a Nigerian novelist. In 2007, he won the Ken Saro-Wiwa Prize for Prose for his novel Unbridled.

Education 
Dibia studied at the University of Ibadan, and earned a B.A. in Modern European Languages (German).

Career 
Jude's novels have been described as daring and controversial by readers and critics in and out of Africa. Walking with Shadows is said to be the first Nigerian novel that has a gay man as its central character and that treats his experienpositivegreat insight, inviting a positive response to his situation. Unbridled, too, stirred some controversy on its publication; it is a story that tackles the emancipation of its female protagonist, who had suffered incest and various abuse from men.

Dibia's short stories have appeared on various online literary sites, including AfricanWriter.com and Halftribe.com. One of his short stories is included in the anthology One World: A global anthology of short stories, alongside stories by such critically acclaimed writers as Chimamanda Ngozi Adichie and Jhumpa Lahiri.

Academic analysis of Jude Dibia's writings 
Sesan, Azeez Akinwumi. Sexuality, Morality and Identity Construction in Jude Dibia's Walking with Shadows. Ibadan Journal of English Studies 7 (2018): 453–468. 
Sotunsa, Ebunoluwa Mobolanle  & Festus Alabi. The Portrayal of Homosexuality in Jude Dibia's Walking with Shadows. Ibadan Journal of English Studies 7 (2018):437-452.

Award 
 Winner for the 2007 Ken Saro-Wiwa Prize for Prose for Unbridled
 Finalist for the 2007 Nigeria Prize for Literature award for Unbridled

Works 
Walking with Shadows (BlackSands Books, 2005)
Unbridled (2007)
Blackbird (2011).
Among Strangers

References

External links
 "I want to tell stories people are not bold enough", Sun newspaper, November 1, 2005.
 Olusola Agbaje, "12 Things You Didn’t Know About Jude Dibia", Aphroden.

1975 births
Living people
Residents of Lagos
21st-century Nigerian novelists
University of Ibadan alumni
Nigerian male novelists
21st-century short story writers
21st-century male writers